Shot to Hell is the seventh studio album by American heavy metal band Black Label Society. It was released September 12, 2006, and was the band's first  record released by Roadrunner Records.

Track listing

Production
According to Zakk Wylde, the band "just came in here and started knocking it out. That's how you make records."

The cover art was originally of three nuns with shotguns (as seen in the advertisements handed out at Ozzfest 2006), but it was deemed inappropriate and was changed to three nuns playing a game of pool. The version with shotguns was used as the cover of the "Concrete Jungle" single.

Reception

According to AllMusic, despite the band's change of label, "not much has changed artistically, no doubt to the relief of fans. Over the course of 13 songs, the band showcases impressive musicianship, incorporating occasional moodiness and balladic touches into its otherwise charging style of metal. The usual comparisons to Alice in Chains, Pantera, and Corrosion of Conformity are as apt as ever."

According to Blabbermouth.net, "Shot to Hell will not cause [the band] to lose fans, even with the abundance of ballads this time around. In fact, it is easier to listen to Shot to Hell in one sitting because of the song variety....Shot to Hell is probably more of what you expect with just a hint of progression."

Rock Hard gave a more positive summary, stating that the band had acquired a greater sense of its own style, with groovy mid-speed hits. The review noted that there was an unneeded absence of complexity.

Personnel
Black Label Society
Zakk Wylde – guitars, vocals, talk box, piano, keyboards, mellotron, organ
John DeServio – bass
Craig Nunenmacher – drums

Production

Produced by Zakk Wylde
Executive producer – Michael Beinhorn
Associate producers and engineers – Barry Conley, David Allen
Mixed by Randy Staub, except "Faith Is Blind", mixed by Dave Allen
Mastered by Ted Jensen
Management – Bob Ringe (Survival Management)
Assistant management – Barbaranne Wylde
Founding Father (A&R) – Mike Gitter

Artwork concept – Zakk Wylde, Barbaranne Wylde
Artwork production – Barbaranne Wylde
Artwork photography – Neil Zlozower
Artwork design and layout – Rob "RA" Arvizuae
Artwork casting – Deborah German Casting
Wardrobe – Bobbie Mannix
Makeup – Ralis Kahn
Nuns – Pat McNeely, Mary Lou Secor, Nan Taylor
Devils – Frank Bettag, David Case, Richard Summers

Charts

Singles
Billboard (North America)

References

2006 albums
Black Label Society albums
Roadrunner Records albums
Albums produced by Michael Beinhorn